Cephaloplon pedunculatum is a species of beetle in the family Cerambycidae, the only species in the genus Cephaloplon.

References

Ibidionini
Monotypic Cerambycidae genera